WVRC-FM (104.7 FM) is a radio station broadcasting a Country format. Licensed to Spencer, West Virginia, United States, it serves the Spencer area. The station is currently owned by Andrew Miller, through licensee ASM Communications Inc.

External links
 

VRC-FM